Tabley Inferior is a civil parish in the Borough of Cheshire East and ceremonial county of Cheshire in England.  It has a population of 137. Tabley House is located there.

See also

 Listed buildings in Tabley Inferior

References

Civil parishes in Cheshire